Boggle can refer to:

Boggle, a word game
Boggle (1997 video game), a video game based on the word game of the same name
Bogle, boggle or bogill, a Northumbrian and Scots term for a ghost or folkloric being
Boggart, a creature in English folklore
Boggle (game show), an interactive game show hosted by Wink Martindale that aired on The Family Channel in 1994

See also
 Biggle (disambiguation)